The Independent Girls Schools Sports Association (IGSSA) was established in 1963 with the inaugural Athletics Carnival at Perry Lakes Stadium. This followed with the first Interschool Swimming Meet in 1965 at Beatty Park Aquatics Centre. In 1967 IGSA drew up a constitution for the Independent Girls’ Schools Athletics Association. The aim was to organise interschool sporting fixtures, which member schools of the Association of Principals of Independent Girls Schools Western Australia were participants, and to establish necessary financial arrangements. In the same year the schools renamed themselves the Independent Girls Schools Sportsmistresses Association.

A review was held of IGSA sport in 1985. Subsequently the name was changed to the Independent Girls Schools Sports Association (Western Australia).

IGSSA provides member schools with the opportunity to compete in a variety of sporting and cultural activities.

Current member schools

Sports 
 Rowing
 Basketball
 Hockey
 Netball
 Tennis
 Soccer
 Softball
 Volleyball
 Swimming
 Dance
 Waterpolo

Carnivals
 Athletics
 Cross Country
 Swimming

External links
Independent Girls' Schools' Sports Association
Iona Presentation College
Methodist Ladies' College
Penrhos College
Perth College
Presbyterian Ladies' College
Santa Maria College
St Hilda's Anglican School for Girls
St Mary's Anglican Girls' School

Australian school sports associations
Schools
Organisations based in Perth, Western Australia